Molé is a surname of French origin. Notable people with the surname include:

 Louis-Mathieu Molé (1781–1855), French statesman
 Mathieu Molé (1584–1656), French statesman

See also
 Mole (surname)

Surnames of French origin